Vladimir Aniskin (born 15 December 1973) is a Russian miniature sculptor and Senior Researcher at the ITAM SB RAS, Guinness World Record Holder.

Biography
Vladimir Aniskin was born in Novosibirsk in 1973.

He graduated from Novosibirsk State University with a red diploma.

Since 1999, Vladimir Aniskin became an employee of the Institute of Theoretical and Applied Mechanics of the SB RAS (ITAM SB RAS).

In 2004, he defended his Ph. D dissertation. In 2013, scientist defended his doctoral dissertation.

Artworks
The artist has been interested in microminiature since 1998. In 2006, he created a New Year tree with a height of 550 microns, placing it on a cut of poppy seeds; in 2009, Aniskin made a composition "Yolka", consisting of a New Year tree with a height of 160 microns, a snowman (80 microns) and Christmas tree decorations with a diameter of 10 microns. Among his miniature works are "Shod flea", "Camels in the eye of a needle", "The smallest book in the world", etc.

Guinness World Record
A miniature copy of the Soviet Seyatel Coin was entered in the Guinness Book of Records as the world's smallest copy of the coin. Its size is 3.13 mm, weight is 0.018 g.

Family
Vladimir Aniskin is married to Svetlana and has three sons, Matvei, Fyodor and Vladimir.

External links
 The Novosibirsk master made the smallest Christmas tree. NGS. December 9, 2009.
  Novosibirsk "lefty" has created the world's smallest book. Novosti Sibirskoy Nauki. March 1, 2016.
 Three grains for a mortgage: a Siberian microminiaturist is ready to sell microscopic football trophies for 1.9 million rubles. Komsomolskaya Pravda. May 24, 2018.
 Vladimir Aniskin: "I have a strategic stock of fleas for 20 years." Novosibirskie Novosti. August 23, 2018.
 Microminiature master Vladimir Aniskin exhibited his works outside Novosibirsk. Sib.fm. December 19, 2019.
 Smallest replica coin. Guinness World Records.

1973 births
Living people
Microminiature sculptors
21st-century Russian sculptors
Scientists from Novosibirsk
Artists from Novosibirsk